Lauren Tamayo (formerly Lauren Franges, born  October 26, 1983 in Barto) is an American professional racing cyclist.

Career highlights

2001
3rd, National U19 Time Trial Championship, Redding, California
2004
2nd, National U23 Road Race Championship, Park City
2005
 U23 Road Race Champion, Park City
2nd, National Points race Championship, Los Angeles
3rd, National U23 Time Trial Championship, Park City
2006
2nd, Saturn Rochester Twilight Criterium, Rochester, New York
2007
1st, Stage 5, Tour de Toona
2008
3rd, World Cup, Track, Team Pursuit, Los Angeles (with Kristin Armstrong & Christen King)
2013
3rd Team Pursuit, Los Angeles Grand Prix (with Cari Higgins, Elizabeth Newell and Jade Wilcoxson)
2015
2nd  Team Pursuit, Pan American Games (with Kelly Catlin, Sarah Hammer, Ruth Winder and Jennifer Valente)

External links

1983 births
Living people
American female cyclists
American track cyclists
Olympic silver medalists for the United States in cycling
Cyclists at the 2012 Summer Olympics
Cyclists at the 2015 Pan American Games
Medalists at the 2012 Summer Olympics
Pan American Games medalists in cycling
Pan American Games silver medalists for the United States
Medalists at the 2015 Pan American Games
21st-century American women
Cyclists from Pennsylvania